Terricciola is a comune (municipality) in the Province of Pisa in the Italian region Tuscany, located about  southwest of Florence and about  southeast of Pisa.

Terricciola borders the following municipalities: Capannoli, Casciana Terme Lari, Chianni, Lajatico, Peccioli.

References

External links

 Official website

Cities and towns in Tuscany